Edson Omar Álvarez Velázquez (born 24 October 1997), also known as El Machín, is a Mexican professional footballer who plays for Eredivisie club Ajax and the Mexico national team. Mainly a defensive midfielder, he is also capable of playing as a centre-back.

Early life
Álvarez was born in Tlalnepantla de Baz, a municipality just north of Mexico City, to Adriana Velázquez and Evaristo Álvarez. As a child he would work for his family's business of manufacturing football jerseys for local teams, which he cites as his first foray into the sport. At age 14, Álvarez tried out for the youth team of Pachuca, though Álvarez did not make the team due to his short stature. Contemplating quitting football, to the resistance of his parents who believed he had the talent to pursue his dream of playing professionally, Álvarez decided to try out for Club América's youth team, eventually making the team after a three-month tryout. He would make it to the daily team practices by way of a three-to-four-hour round trip commute from his home in Tlalnepantla and the club's training ground in Coapa. According to Álvarez, he would spend almost 70 percent of his monthly salary toward transportation.

Club career

América
In 2014, at age 16, Álvarez joined Club América's youth system, playing for the under-17 team. The following year, while still playing for the under-17 squad, Álvarez was promoted to América's second division team.

In August 2016, first team coach Ignacio Ambríz gave Álvarez his first call-up, sitting on the bench in América's week 5 league match against Monarcas Morelia, using the jersey number 282. On 29 October, newly appointed coach Ricardo La Volpe gave 19 year-old Álvarez his Liga MX debut in the team's win over Santos Laguna; he played all 90 minutes and was voted third in a Man of the Match online poll by club fans. On 25 December, he scored his first career goal in the Apertura final against Tigres UANL.

Prior to the start of the 2017–18 season, Álvarez was handed the number 4 shirt, which was vacated following the departure of Erik Pimentel.

On 16 December 2018, Álvarez was given the start for the return leg of the Apertura final against Cruz Azul, playing in midfield in place of the injured Mateus Uribe, and scored twice as América won its 13th league title following a 2–0 aggregate score. On 23 February 2019, Álvarez made his 100th competitive appearance for América in the team's 3–0 victory over Lobos BUAP.

Ajax
On 19 July 2019, Dutch club AFC Ajax announced an agreement with Club América for the signing of Álvarez on a five-year contract, subject to a medical, for a reported fee of US$17 million. He passed his medical and was officially presented on 22 July, being handed the number 4 shirt which had been vacated following the departure of Matthijs de Ligt. The club announced an official transfer sum of €15 million. On 17 August, Álvarez made his competitive debut for Ajax as a 74th minute substitute in the team's 4–1 league win over VVV-Venlo. On 29 August, Álvarez scored his first goal in his first start against APOEL in the second-leg of the UEFA Champions League play-off round. On 17 September, Álvarez scored the second goal in the 3–0 Champions League group stage victory over Lille, becoming the first Mexican player to score on his Champions League debut.

On 21 March 2021, Álvarez scored his first Eredivisie goal for Ajax in a 5–0 victory over ADO Den Haag. On 18 April, in the Dutch Cup final against Vitesse, he played the entirety of the match in a 2–1 victory. At the end of his second season, he was nominated for the league Player of the Year Award.

On 27 October 2021, it was announced Álvarez had signed a contract extension with Ajax, keeping him with the club until 2025. On 30 April 2022 he was inducted into the club's Club van 100, making his 100th appearance in a 3–0 league victory over PEC Zwolle, becoming the 174th player in the history of the club to join the ranks.

International career

Youth
Álvarez was called up to the under-20 team camp preparing for the 2017 CONCACAF U-20 Championship en route to the 2017 FIFA U-20 World Cup. He was included in the tournament's best XI. Álvarez was included in the World Cup under-20 squad, and scored the winning goal in Mexico's 3–2 win over Group B minnows Vanuatu.

Senior
On 30 January 2017, Álvarez received his first call up to the senior national team for a friendly against Iceland. He made his senior debut on 8 February against Iceland, replacing Jesús Molina in the 60th minute. Along with Alejandro Mayorga, Álvarez was cited to be a supporting practice squad player with the Confederations Cup team. He was called up to the Gold Cup, making him the youngest player on the squad. The roster was largely composed of alternate players, as the primary squad was in Russia competing in the Confederations Cup. On 17 July, in the last game of the group stage against Curaçao, Álvarez scored his first goal for the national team in their 2–0 win, becoming the youngest Mexican player to score a goal in a Gold Cup tournament at 19 years old.

In May 2018, Álvarez was named to Mexico's preliminary 28-man squad for the World Cup. He was the youngest player on the list. He was ultimately included in the final 23-man roster revealed on 4 June. He appeared in all of Mexico's group stage matches; in Mexico's final group match against Sweden, Álvarez started at right-back and scored an own goal at the 74th minute in Mexico's 3–0 loss. He also started in the round-of-16 defeat to Brazil.

In May 2019, Álvarez was included in Gerardo Martino's provisional Gold Cup roster. In a friendly match against Venezuela, he suffered an apparent knee injury but was revealed to only be a scare. He was included in the final list for the competition. Álvarez appeared as a starter in five matches, including the final, as Mexico would go on to win the tournament.

In October 2022, Álvarez was named in Mexico's preliminary 31-man squad for the World Cup, and in November, was ultimately included in the final 26-man roster.

Career statistics

Club

International

Scores and results list Mexico's goal tally first, score column indicates score after each Álvarez goal.

Honours
América
Liga MX: Apertura 2018
Copa MX: Clausura 2019

Ajax
Eredivisie: 2020–21, 2021–22
KNVB Cup: 2020–21

Mexico
CONCACAF Gold Cup: 2019

Individual
CONCACAF U-20 Championship Best XI: 2017
CONCACAF Best XI: 2018, 2021
CONCACAF Gold Cup Best XI: 2021
Eredivisie Team of the Month: April 2021
IFFHS CONCACAF Best XI: 2020

References

External links

 Profile at the AFC Ajax website
 
 

1997 births
Living people
People from Tlalnepantla de Baz
Footballers from the State of Mexico
Association football defenders
Club América footballers
AFC Ajax players
Liga MX players
Liga Premier de México players
Eredivisie players
Mexico youth international footballers
Mexico under-20 international footballers
Mexico international footballers
2017 CONCACAF Gold Cup players
2018 FIFA World Cup players
2019 CONCACAF Gold Cup players
2021 CONCACAF Gold Cup players
CONCACAF Gold Cup-winning players
Mexican expatriate footballers
Mexican expatriate sportspeople in the Netherlands
Expatriate footballers in the Netherlands
2022 FIFA World Cup players
Mexican footballers